Robert Bower may refer to:

Robert Bower (died 1606), MP for Salisbury
Sir Robert Lister Bower (1860–1929), British Army, colonial and police officer
Robert W. Bower (born 1936), American applied physicist
Robert Bower (Conservative politician) (1894–1975), British Conservative politician, MP for Cleveland, 1931–1945

See also
Bower (disambiguation)
Robert (disambiguation)
Robert Bowers (disambiguation)